Vural Öger (born 1 February 1942) is a Turkish-German businessman and politician who served as a Member of the European Parliament from 2004 until 2009. He is a member of the Social Democratic Party of Germany, part of the Socialist Group.

Life 
Born in Ankara, Öger is of Turkish descent, but has spent most of his life in Germany. During his time in Parliament, he served on the Committee on Foreign Affairs. He was a substitute for the Committee on Transport and Tourism, a member of the Delegation to the EU-Turkey Joint Parliamentary Committee and a substitute for the Delegation for relations with the Korean Peninsula.

Biography
 1969: Graduated from Berlin Technical University
 1973: Founded Öger Türktur GmbH
 1985: Founded Öger Tours (managing director)
 1990: Öger Company
 1998: Board Member of the German-Turkish Foundation
 2000: Member of the Federal Government Immigration Commission

Decorations
 2001: Order of Merit of Turkey with distinction for special services
 2001: Bundesverdienstkreuz with ribbon

See also 
 Turks in Germany
 2004 European Parliament election in Germany

References

External links
 
 
 

1942 births
Politicians from Ankara
Turkish emigrants to West Germany
Naturalized citizens of Germany
German politicians of Turkish descent
Living people
German businesspeople
Turkish businesspeople
MEPs for Germany 2004–2009
Recipients of the Cross of the Order of Merit of the Federal Republic of Germany
Social Democratic Party of Germany MEPs